Plectonotum is a genus of soldier beetles in the family Cantharidae. There is at least one described species in Plectonotum, P. excisum.

References

Further reading

 
 

Cantharidae
Articles created by Qbugbot